Ioan N. Lahovary or Ion Lahovari; January 25, 1844 – June 14, 1915) was a member of Romanian aristocracy, a politician and diplomat who served as the Minister of Foreign Affairs of Romania.

Life and political career
Ioan Lahovary was the brother of Alexandru Lahovary, who also previously served as foreign minister and General Iacob Lahovary who was his predecessor in the post of Minister of Foreign Affairs and later Minister of War. He was the father of the Princess Marthe Bibesco, a famous Romanian writer.

He was elected deputy, being a member of the Conservative Party since 1871. Lahovary served two terms as foreign minister: from April 11, 1899, until July 6, 1900, in the Gheorghe Gr. Cantacuzino Cabinet and March 12, 1907, until December 27, 1908.

He was a member of the senate from the conservative party, and he also served as chairman of the Senate.

Ioan Lahovary died on June 14, 1915, in Bucharest.

Gallery

See also
Foreign relations of Romania

References

|-

|-

1844 births
1915 deaths
Nobility from Bucharest
Conservative Party (Romania, 1880–1918) politicians
Romanian Ministers of Foreign Affairs
Romanian Ministers of Agriculture
Members of the Chamber of Deputies (Romania)
Presidents of the Senate of Romania
Politicians from Bucharest
Burials at Bellu Cemetery